Pine Level, also known as Pine Tucky, is an unincorporated community in Montgomery County, Alabama, United States.

History
Pine Level was originally known as Pine Tucky, most likely due to its location on poor sandy soil covered with pine trees. The community later began to be called Pine Level. A post office first opened under the name Pine Level in 1839.

Notable people
Rosa Parks, her arrest served as a catalyst to the Montgomery bus boycott during the Civil Rights Movement. She lived in Pine Level as a child.
Claudette Colvin, arrested for refusing to give up her seat on a segregated bus, nine months before Rosa Parks was arrested for doing the same thing. She lived in Pine Level until she was 8-years-old.

References

Unincorporated communities in Montgomery County, Alabama
Unincorporated communities in Alabama